Jonathan Blitstein is a current American film producer, former playwright, and indie filmmaker. He currently runs Tandem Pictures, and previously was an executive at Astronauts Wanted, (affiliated with Sony Music) and Disney Digital Network, a subsidiary of The Walt Disney Company.

Blitstein directed the independent mumblecore film Let Them Chirp Awhile and a play, Keep Your Baggage With You, for which he won the New York Innovative Theatre Award in 2011.

Personal life and Education
Blitstein was born on October 28, 1982 in Lincolnshire, Illinois. Blitstein graduated with a BFA from the Maurice Kanbar Institute of Film and Television Production at the Tisch School of the Arts."  Blitstein previously studied acting at The Second City, the Piven Theatre Workshop, LAByrinth Theater Company, and Primary Stages.

Plays

 Squealer produced with Lesser America in Spring 2011
 Keep Your Baggage With You (at all times) (2009) (First produced at Theater for the New City part of the Dream Up Festival, Summer 2010)

Films
Black Bear (2020) - Producer
The Surrogate (2020) - Producer
Let Them Chirp Awhile (2007) Feature Film
Another Kind (2011) Feature Film

References

External links
Interview with Blitstein from Film Intuition Magazine

1982 births
Living people
21st-century American dramatists and playwrights
American male screenwriters
Tisch School of the Arts alumni
People from Lincolnshire, Illinois
American male dramatists and playwrights
Screenwriters from Illinois
21st-century American male writers